Mineiros Esporte Clube, commonly known as Mineiros, is a Brazilian football club based in Mineiros, Goiás state. They competed in the Copa do Brasil once.

History
The club was founded on January 20, 1977. They won the Campeonato Goiano (Third Division) in 2003, and the Campeonato Goiano (Second Division) in 2004. Mineiros competed in the Copa do Brasil in 2006, when they were eliminated in the Second Round by Atlético Mineiro after eliminating Americano in the First Round.

Achievements

 Campeonato Goiano (Second Division):
 Winners (1): 2004
 Campeonato Goiano (Third Division):
 Winners (1): 2003

Stadium
Mineiros Esporte Clube play their home games at Estádio Odilon Flores. The stadium has a maximum capacity of 7,000 people.

Players

Squad 2021

References

Association football clubs established in 1977
Football clubs in Goiás
1977 establishments in Brazil